Miocyon ("lesser dog") is an extinct genus of placental mammals from clade Carnivoraformes, that lived in North America from early to late Eocene.

Phylogeny
The phylogenetic relationships of genus Miocyon are shown in the following cladogram:

See also
 Mammal classification
 Carnivoraformes
 Miacidae

References

†
Extinct mammals of North America
Miacids